The Mute's House is a 2015 Israeli documentary film directed by Tamar Kay about the Rajabi's, a single mother and her son, both Palestinians living in the Jewish quarter of the West Bank city of Hebron. The film was produced by Ariel Richter and Tamar Kay as their thesis film at The Jerusalem Sam Spiegel Film & Television School. The film was well received by critics and audiences. In October 2016, the film was listed as one of the 10 shortlisted films to compete for the 89th Academy Award's Best Documentary Short Subject.

Story 
A building in Hebron, which has been deserted by its Palestinian owners, is called “The Mute's House" by the Israeli soldiers stationed there and by the tour guides who pass by. The building's only occupants are a deaf woman, Sahar, and her eight-year-old son, Yousef. The family's unique story, which unfolds against the backdrop of the Israeli-Palestinian conflict, is told through the eyes of the young and charismatic Yousef, as he goes through his daily routine in both the Jewish and Muslim areas of a city torn apart by hatred and violence.

Release & Reception 
The film premiered in November 2015 at IDFA, and has participated in over 20 international film festivals since. It premiered on Israel's Channel 8 on January 21, 2017. The film has received mostly positive reactions and reviews. As the film deals with the politically volatile subject of the West Bank, there has been some criticism by both right and left wing audiences regarding the representation of the city and its residents.

Awards and nominations

References 
 Touching doc on 'unique, amazing' Palestinian boy contends for Oscar nomination - NonFictionFilm.com - Jan 13, 2017
 'Storm' drifts off Oscar map, but 'Mute's House' stands its ground - Jewish Journal - Dec. 21, 2016
 Oscars: 10 Doc Shorts That Go to Great Lengths - The Hollywood Reporter - Nov. 15, 2016
 10 Documentary Shorts Vie for Nominations - IndieWire - Oct. 26, 2016

External links 
 The Mute's House Official Website
 
 The Mute's House Trailer on YouTube

Israeli documentary films
2015 films